The Selangor State Executive Council (Malay: Majlis Mesyuarat Kerajaan Negeri Selangor) is the executive authority of the Government of Selangor, Malaysia. The Council comprises the Menteri Besar, appointed by the Sultan on the basis that he is able to command a majority in the Selangor State Legislative Assembly, a number of members made up of members of the Assembly, the State Secretary, the State Legal Adviser and the State Financial Officer.

This Council is similar in structure and role to the Cabinet of Malaysia, while being smaller in size. As federal and state responsibilities differ, there are a number of portfolios that differ between the federal and state governments.

Members of the Council are selected by the Menteri Besar, appointed by the Sultan. The Council has no ministry, but instead a number of committees; each committee will take care of certain state affairs, activities and departments. Members of the Council are always the chair of a committee.

Current members 

As of 7 October 2020, the members of the Council are:

Ex officio members

Azmin EXCO (2014-2018)
 PKR (5)
 DAP (3)
 PAS (3)

Khalid II EXCO (2013-2014)
 PKR (4)
 PAS (4)
 DAP (3)

Khalid I EXCO (2008-2013)
 PKR (5)
 DAP (3)
 PAS (3)

See also 
 Sultan of Selangor
 List of Menteris Besar of Selangor
 Selangor State Legislative Assembly

References

External links 
 Selangor State Government

Politics of Selangor
Selangor